Taufik Suliman Cotran CBE (also spelled Taufig Cotran or Taufiq Cotran; 6 August 1926 – 8 March 2007) was a Commonwealth jurist.

Born in Haifa, Mandatory Palestine, he was studying in London when the State of Israel was established in 1948, and found himself unable to return home. He instead pursued his legal career in various Commonwealth countries. While living in London and working as a barrister, he naturalised as a Citizen of the United Kingdom and Colonies in 1951.

He went on to work as a police magistrate in Khartoum, Anglo-Egyptian Sudan, and headed the committee of enquiry into the August 1955 Sudan Defence Force mutiny at Torit, Juba, Yei, and Maridi at the beginning of the First Sudanese Civil War. He was named Chief Justice of Lesotho in 1976. He was named a Commander of the Most Excellent Order of the British Empire in the 1980 Birthday Honours. He became Chief Justice of Belize in 1986. He stepped down from that position in 1990, and was succeeded the following year by George Brown. He died at his home in Burnham Beeches, England in 2007.

References

1926 births
2007 deaths
Chief justices of Belize
Commanders of the Order of the British Empire
British judges on the courts of Belize
British judges on the courts of Lesotho
Naturalised citizens of the United Kingdom
British people of Palestinian descent
Palestinian emigrants to the United Kingdom
People from Haifa
Anglo-Egyptian Sudan judges